The 2008 UEFA European Football Championship, commonly referred to as UEFA Euro 2008 or simply Euro 2008, was the 13th UEFA European Championship, a quadrennial football tournament contested by the member nations of UEFA (the Union of European Football Associations). It took place in Austria and Switzerland (both hosting the tournament for the first time) from 7 to 29 June 2008.

The tournament was won by Spain, who defeated Germany 1–0 in the final. Spain were only the second nation to win all their group stage fixtures and then the European Championship itself, matching France's achievement from 1984. Spain were also the first team since Germany in 1996 to win the tournament undefeated.

Greece were the defending champions going into the tournament, having won UEFA Euro 2004. They recorded the worst finish in Euro 2008, losing their three group fixtures and collecting the least prize money. Throughout 31 matches, the participating nations totalled 77 goals, the same as the previous tournament.

Austria and Switzerland automatically qualified as hosts; the remaining 14 teams were determined through a qualifying tournament, played between August 2006 and November 2007. As European champions, Spain earned the right to compete in the 2009 FIFA Confederations Cup in South Africa.

Bid process

Austria and Switzerland jointly bid to host the games, and facing competition from six other bids: Bosnia and Herzegovina–Croatia, Greece–Turkey, a 4-way Nordic bid (from Denmark, Finland, Norway and Sweden), Hungary, Russia and Scotland–Republic of Ireland. Austria and Hungary had previously bid together to host Euro 2004, losing out to Portugal, while Sweden had hosted Euro 1992.

Austria–Switzerland, Hungary, Greece–Turkey and the Nordic bid were recommended, in that order, before the final vote by UEFA's National Teams Committee.

The final vote by the UEFA executive committee was:
Austria–Switzerland
Hungary
Greece–Turkey
Nordic
Scotland–Ireland
Russia
Bosnia and Herzegovina–Croatia

The Austria–Switzerland bid became the second successful joint bid in the competition's history, following the UEFA Euro 2000 hosted by Belgium and the Netherlands. The following tournament, held in Poland and Ukraine, became the third jointly hosted tournament.

Summary
Qualification for Euro 2008 started in August 2006, just over a month after the end of the 2006 FIFA World Cup. The qualifying tournament was contested by national teams from each of UEFA's member associations except Austria and Switzerland, who had automatically qualified for the final tournament as hosts, and Montenegro, who came into existence too late to be admitted to UEFA. England was the only seeded team not to qualify for the tournament proper, whereas Russia was the only unseeded one to qualify. The tournament also marked the debuts of Austria and Poland.

The draw for the final tournament took place on 2 December 2007, and saw Group C immediately labelled as the "group of death", with Italy, France, Romania and the Netherlands competing for the two qualifying places. In contrast, Germany and Portugal were deemed to have an easy draw, as the tournament structure meant they could not meet Italy, France, the Netherlands or Spain until the final.

In the group stage, Croatia, Spain and the Netherlands all qualified with maximum points. Austria and Switzerland were not expected to progress, despite the advantage of being the hosts. In Group A, the Swiss lost their captain, Alexander Frei, to injury in their first game and became the first team to be eliminated from the tournament, after losing their first two matches. Switzerland managed to beat the group winner Portugal in their last game.

In Group B, Austria managed to set up a decisive final game against Germany, dubbed "Austria's final". However, they lost by one goal, making Euro 2008 the first European Championship not to have one of the host nations present in the knockout phase. In an exciting final game in Group A, an injury- and suspension-hit Turkey came back from 2–0 down to beat the Czech Republic 3–2, after an uncharacteristic handling mistake by Petr Čech, in the last few minutes, left Nihat Kahveci with the simplest of finishes.

In the same game, goalkeeper Volkan Demirel was shown a red card for pushing Czech striker Jan Koller to the ground. The Turks joined Portugal as the qualifiers from Group A. France were the high-profile victims of Group C, recording just one point from a goalless draw against Romania in their opening game. Italy beat the French, on the final day, to finish on four points and join the Netherlands in the quarter-finals. Finally, in Group D, Greece failed to reproduce the form of their shock 2004 win, and ended the tournament with no points. Russia qualified at the expense of Sweden, after beating them in a final game decider, joining Spain in the knockout phase.

Torrential rain during the Group A match between Switzerland and Turkey on 11 June resulted in the pitch at St. Jakob-Park in Basel requiring to be re-laid. The new pitch was installed in advance of the quarter-final match between Portugal and Germany on 19 June. In the quarter-finals, the Portuguese team was unable to give their coach, Luiz Felipe Scolari, a fitting send-off – following the mid-tournament announcement that Scolari would be leaving to join English club Chelsea – losing in an exciting game against Germany. Turkey continued their streak of last-gasp wins, equalising at the end of extra-time against Croatia and advancing on penalties. Coached by Dutchman Guus Hiddink, Russia eliminated the Netherlands with two extra-time goals. The last quarter-final match saw Spain defeat Italy on penalties, after a goalless draw in regular time.

Turkey's progress was halted by Germany in the semi-finals. Turkey entered the game with nine of their squad members missing due to injury or suspension, but still scored the first goal. Later, they levelled the score at 2–2, before Germany scored the winning goal in the final minute. The world television feed of the match was intermittently lost during the match, which prevented the broadcast of Germany's second goal.

This was due to a thunderstorm at the broadcasting relay station in Austria, despite the game being played in Switzerland. Swiss Television SRG SSR still had a feed, because of their own broadcasting facilities at the venue. During the lost world feed, German and Austrian television ZDF and ORF started to broadcast the feed of German-speaking Swiss channel SF 1.

This act ensured that the German goal was actually broadcast in Germany although not in Turkey. Spain won the second semi-final against Russia by three goals to nil, through second-half goals from Xavi, Daniel Güiza and David Silva, earning Spain their first appearance in a major final for 24 years.

In the final, held at Vienna's Ernst-Happel-Stadion, Spain became European champions for the second time after Fernando Torres' first-half goal proved enough to defeat Germany. Though Germany had a strong start, Spain started to look more dangerous after they had settled.

After half an hour, Xavi played a pass in behind the Germany back line towards Torres, who outmuscled a hesitant Philipp Lahm and clipped the ball over the diving Jens Lehmann and just inside the far post. That goal proved to be the only goal of the game, which Spain dominated despite Germany having the majority of the possession, and Spain were crowned UEFA Euro 2008 champions.

Qualification

The draw for the qualifying round took place in Montreux, Switzerland on 27 January 2006 at 12:00 CET.

The qualifying process commenced a month after the 2006 World Cup. Austria and Switzerland automatically qualified for the tournament finals as host nations.

The qualifying format was changed compared to previous tournaments. The winners and runners-up from seven groups automatically qualified for the Championship, with the hosts filling the other two slots in the 16-team tournament. The change means there were no play-offs between teams finishing in second place in the groups – they qualified directly for the finals. Teams that finished outside the top two positions in their groups failed to qualify. Group A contained eight teams, and the others contained seven.

12 out of 16 teams who qualified for previous tournament also qualified, but the hosts, Austria, and Poland made their debuts at the European Championship. Romania and Turkey returned after missing out the 2004 tournament. Notable absentees were England and Ukraine (both 2006 World Cup quarter-finalists) and Denmark, who failed to qualify for the first time since 1980. Bulgaria and Latvia also failed to qualify after playing in Euro 2004.

As of 2020, this was the last time that England and Ukraine failed to qualify for the European Championship finals.

Qualified teams

Final draw
The draw for the final tournament took place on 2 December 2007 at the Lucerne Culture and Congress Centre in Switzerland.

As was the case at the 2000 and 2004 finals, the finalists were divided into four seeding pots, based on the 2007 edition of the UEFA national team coefficient ranking, which measured performance of teams in the 2006 FIFA World Cup qualifying and Euro 2008 qualifying, with each group having one team drawn from each pot. In a return to the format used at Euro 1992 and Euro 1996 the games in each group were held at just two stadia, with the seeded team playing all three matches in the same city. Switzerland and Austria, as co-hosts, were automatically assigned to positions A1 and B1, respectively. The remaining 14 teams were split into four pots, with title-holders Greece seeded alongside the Netherlands in Pot 1.

UEFA came under heavy criticism from Raymond Domenech, manager of France, who was not satisfied with his team's position in the draw, and was also in favour of having 2006 FIFA World Cup winners Italy as top seed. On 22 November 2007, Giorgio Marchetti, UEFA's professional football director, announced that a review of the coefficient ranking system was under way for future European Championships.

All teams from each pot, were drawn consecutively into Group A to D. From Pot 1, the remaining two teams for Group C and Group D were first drawn. All Pot 1 teams automatically occupy the first positions of their groups. Next step was to draw all teams in the order from Pot 4, Pot 3 and Pot 2; and for these teams the next group positions 2/3/4 were drawn separately from an extra glass bowl, for the purposes of determining the match schedules in each group. Coincidentally, all teams from Pots 2, 3, and 4 drew the exact same group position number as their pot number.

The draw resulted in the following groups:

Venues
The tournament was played at eight venues throughout the two host nations; four in Austria and four in Switzerland. Each venue had a capacity of at least 30,000 for the tournament; the largest stadium was Ernst-Happel-Stadion in Vienna with a capacity of 53,295. It was for this reason that Ernst-Happel-Stadion hosted the final. Switzerland played all three group stage matches at St. Jakob Park in Basel, which also hosted the opening match of the tournament as a compromise for the final being held in Vienna. Austria played all of their group stage matches at Ernst-Happel-Stadion.

In 2004, the Zürich venue became a problem for the organisers. Originally, the Hardturm stadium was to be renovated and used as the city's venue, but legal challenges delayed the plan to a point that would not have allowed the ground to be used in 2008. This created a problem, as the agreement between UEFA and the organisers stipulated that four venues would be used in each country. The problem was solved when the organisers proposed renovating Letzigrund instead; UEFA approved the revised plan in January 2005. The Letzigrund stadium hosted its first football match on 23 September 2007.

Team base camps
Each team had access to a "team base camp" for its stay between the matches. The teams trained and resided in these locations during the tournament, and travelled to games that took place away from their bases. The 16 teams validated their option with UEFA on 18 December 2007.

Squads

Teams were required to select a squad of 23 players, three of whom had to be goalkeepers, with the final squad to be submitted to UEFA by 28 May 2008. If a member of the final squad suffered an injury prior to his team's first game that would keep him out of the entire tournament, another player could be called up to replace him.

Match officials
On 19 December 2007, UEFA announced twelve referees and twenty-four assistants were selected for the tournament. In April 2008, after failing a physical fitness test, Norwegian assistant referee Erik Ræstad was replaced by fellow countryman Jan Petter Randen. Italian referee Roberto Rosetti was selected to officiate both the opening match between Switzerland and the Czech Republic and the final between Germany and Spain.

Fourth officials

Group stage

The teams finishing in the top two positions in each of the four groups progressed to the quarter-finals, while the bottom two teams were eliminated from the tournament.

All times are local, CEST (UTC+2).

Tiebreakers
For the three-game group stage of this tournament, where two or more teams in a group tied on an equal number of points, the finishing positions were determined by the following tie-breaking criteria in the following order:
 number of points obtained in the matches among the teams in question
 goal difference in the matches among the teams in question (if more than two teams finish equal on points)
 number of goals scored in the matches among the teams in question (if more than two teams finish equal on points)
 goal difference in all the group matches
 number of goals scored in all the group matches
 coefficient from the qualifying competitions for the 2006 FIFA World Cup and 2006/08 UEFA European Football Championship (points obtained divided by the number of matches played)
 fair play conduct of the teams (final tournament)
 drawing of lots

However, these criteria would not apply if two teams tied on points and goals scored played against each other in their final group match and no other team in group finishes with same points; in that case, the tie would be broken by a penalty shootout.

Group A

Group B

Group C

Group D

Knockout phase

The knockout phase was different from that of past tournaments. Teams in groups A and B were separated from teams in groups C and D until the final. This meant that two teams who meet in the same group would meet again in the semi finals instead of the final if they got this far. Also, in another major change, for the first time in a European Championship, only two venues (St. Jakob-Park, Basel and Ernst-Happel-Stadion, Vienna—the two largest of the eight stadiums used) were used for the seven matches in the knockout phase of the tournament.

As with every tournament since UEFA Euro 1984, there was no third place play-off.

All times are local, CEST (UTC+2).

Bracket

Quarter-finals

Semi-finals

Final

Statistics

Goalscorers

Awards

UEFA Team of the Tournament
The UEFA Technical Team was charged with naming a squad composed of the 23 best players over the course of the tournament. The group of nine analysts watched every game at the tournament before making their decision after the final. Nine players from the winning Spanish team were named in the team of the tournament, while no players knocked out in the group stage were included. Four players from semi-finalists Russia were also included, the first-time ever there were Russian players in the Team of the Tournament following the fall of the Soviet Union.

UEFA Player of the Tournament
The UEFA Technical Team also had to pick a Player of the Tournament, taking fans' votes into account. The player chosen was Spain midfielder Xavi.

 Xavi

Golden Boot
The Golden Boot was awarded to yet another Spaniard, David Villa, who scored four goals, three of which came in his side's 4–1 win over Russia (the only hat-trick scored in the tournament).

 David Villa (4 goals)

Prize money
UEFA announced that total of €184 million has been offered to the 16 teams competing in this tournament, increasing from €129 million in the previous tournament. The distributions as below:
 Prize for participating: €7.5 million

Extra payment based on teams performances:
 Winner: €7.5 million
 Runner-up: €4.5 million
 Semi-finals: €3 million
 Quarter-finals: €2 million
 Group stage (per match):
 Win: €1 million
 Draw: €500,000

Spain, as winners of the tournament and winners of all three of their group stage matches, received a total prize of €23 million, the maximum possible prize money. Greece on the other hand, being the only team to lose all three of their group matches, were the only team to receive nothing more than the €7.5 million participation prize.

Discipline
At UEFA Euro 2008, players may be suspended from playing in subsequent matches upon the collection of a certain number of yellow or red cards. If a player is shown a red card – whether as a result of two bookable offences or a straight red – that player is suspended from playing in his team's next match. If his team is eliminated from the competition before the end of his suspension, the games carry over to the 2010 FIFA World Cup qualification matches. A player is also suspended for one match for picking up two yellow cards in separate matches. However, any yellow cards accumulated are annulled once a team is eliminated from the tournament or reaches the semi-finals.

In extreme cases of ill-discipline, UEFA may choose to have a disciplinary panel examine the incident in order to determine whether or not further suspension is required. One case of this at Euro 2008 was the suspension of Turkey goalkeeper Volkan Demirel for two matches for pushing Czech striker Jan Koller.

The following players were suspended for one or more games as a result of red cards or yellow card accumulation:

Marketing

Television coverage failure
Three times in the second half of the semi-final between Germany and Turkey, nearly the entire global television coverage of the game was interrupted. A thunderstorm over Vienna caused technical difficulties in the International Broadcast Centre (IBC), which relayed the television feed from the match in Basel, Switzerland, resulting in one or more goals being missed by various audiences. Various national broadcasters took emergency contingency measures such as reverting to radio broadcasting (for example, the BBC used coverage from Radio 5 Live, Ireland circumvented the problem by having RTÉ Two's studio presenter Bill O'Herlihy and panellists Eamon Dunphy, Johnny Giles and Liam Brady provide emergency discussion on what had happened in the match, and Øyvind Alsaker, commentator from Norwegian TV2 picked up his mobile and filmed it over a 3G connection). Only the Swiss public broadcaster SRG maintained full coverage since it used a direct signal other than the IBC's.

New trophy
A new trophy was awarded to the winners of the Euro 2008 tournament. The new version of the Henri Delaunay Trophy, created by Asprey London, is almost an exact replica of the original designed by Arthus-Bertrand. A small figure juggling a ball on the back of the original has been removed, as has the marble plinth. The silver base of the trophy also had to be enlarged to make it stable.

Match ball

The match ball for the finals was unveiled at the draw ceremony. Produced by Adidas and named the Europass, it is a 14-panel ball in the same construction as the Teamgeist, but with a modified surface design. A version named the Europass Gloria was used in the final.

There were concerns raised about the match ball, which was claimed to deviate unpredictably in flight, making it difficult to judge for goalkeepers. Notable players to criticise were Germany's Jens Lehmann and the Czech Republic's Petr Čech. These claims were disputed by the ball's designer, Oliver Kahn.

Music
The official melody was composed by Rollo Armstrong of Faithless on behalf of UEFA. The official Euro 2008 song was "Can You Hear Me" by Enrique Iglesias, which was performed live during the official closing ceremony prior to the final in Ernst Happel Stadion in Vienna on 29 June.

Two soundtracks, "Like a Superstar" and "Feel the Rush," were recorded by Jamaican reggae artist Shaggy as mascot songs for Euro 2008. They formed a musical background to video clips featuring the twin mascots Trix and Flix.

The official Swiss song for the tournament was a new version of "Bring en hei" (Bring him Home) by Baschi. Christina Stürmer sang the official tournament song of Austrian ÖFB, "Fieber" (Fever). Croatia manager Slaven Bilić recorded his country's official Euro 2008 song, "Vatreno ludilo" ("Fiery Madness"), with his rock group, Rawbau.

"Seven Nation Army" by The White Stripes was played when players walked out before kick-off, and a remix of "Samba de Janeiro" by German dance group Bellini was played after each goal scored in the competition.

Mascots

The two official mascots for UEFA Euro 2008, were named after a vote from the public of the two host nations from the following options:
 Zigi and Zagi
 Flitz and Bitz
 Trix and Flix

In April 2007, after receiving 36.3% of the vote, Trix and Flix were chosen. "I am sure the mascots and their names will become a vital part of the understanding of the whole event," said Christian Mutschler, the tournament director for Switzerland. The mascots were unveiled on 27 September 2006, in Vienna, Austria. Their official début was on 11 October 2006, at the Austria vs. Switzerland friendly, which ended 2–1.

Slogan
The slogan for UEFA Euro 2008 was chosen on 24 January 2007: Expect Emotions. UEFA President Michel Platini stated, "It describes in a nutshell what the UEFA Euro 2008 has to offer: all kinds of emotions – joy, disappointment, relief or high tension – right up to the final whistle."

Sponsorship
The following companies were global sponsors for the tournament:

 Adidas
 Canon Inc
 Carlsberg Group
 Coca-Cola
 Continental
 Hyundai Motor Group/Kia Corporation
 JVC
 MasterCard
 McDonald's

Broadcasting

References

External links

 UEFA Euro 2008 at UEFA.com
 
 Official Technical Report

 
2008
2007–08 in European football
2007–08 in Austrian football
2007–08 in Swiss football
2008
2008
Austria–Switzerland relations
June 2008 sports events in Europe